The 2020–21 season was the 75th season in existence of Unione Calcio Sampdoria and the club's ninth consecutive season in the top flight of Italian football. In addition to the domestic league, Sampdoria participated in this season's edition of the Coppa Italia. The season covered the period from 3 August 2020 to 30 June 2021.

Players

First-team squad

Other players under contract

On loan

Pre-season and friendlies

Competitions

Overview

Serie A

League table

Results summary

Results by round

Matches
The league fixtures were announced on 2 September 2020.

Coppa Italia

Statistics

Appearances and goals

|-
! colspan=14 style=background:#dcdcdc; text-align:center| Goalkeepers

|-
! colspan=14 style=background:#dcdcdc; text-align:center| Defenders

|-
! colspan=14 style=background:#dcdcdc; text-align:center| Midfielders

|-
! colspan=14 style=background:#dcdcdc; text-align:center| Forwards

|-
! colspan=14 style=background:#dcdcdc; text-align:center| Players transferred out during the season

Goalscorers

References

External links

U.C. Sampdoria seasons
Sampdoria